Bulgarelli is an Italian surname that may refer to
Adelmo Bulgarelli (1932–1984), Italian wrestler 
Emilio Bulgarelli (1917–1993), Italian water polo player
Ettore Bulgarelli (born 1965), Italian rower
Giacomo Bulgarelli (1940–2009), Italian football midfielder
Jason Bulgarelli (born 1976), Australian rugby league player
Marianna Bulgarelli(c. 1684–1734), Italian soprano 
Otávio Bulgarelli (born 1984 ), Brazilian cyclist 

Italian-language surnames